Il viale della speranza (English: The street of hope) is a 1953 Italian drama film directed by Dino Risi. It grossed over 100 million lire at the Italian box office.

Cast
Cosetta Greco as Luisa Guglielmi
Liliana Bonfatti as  Giuditta Robotti
Piera Simoni as Franca Albani
Marcello Mastroianni as Mario Montesi
Pietro De Vico as Tonino
Nerio Bernardi as Franzi
Gisella Monaldi as Titina
Maria Pia Casilio as Concettina
Achille Majeroni as Acting teacher
Bianca Maria Fusari as Stefania
Odoardo Girotti as Giorgio
Franco Migliacci
Silvio Bagolini
Corrado Pani
Carlo Hintermann
Alessandro Fersen
Nino Marchetti
Giulio Calì

References

External links

1953 films
1950s Italian-language films
1953 drama films
Italian black-and-white films
Films directed by Dino Risi
Films scored by Mario Nascimbene
Films set in Rome
Italian drama films
1950s Italian films